Lowell David Flyr (1937-1971) was an American botanist. Born in Stratford, Texas, Flyr conducted his graduate thesis work at the University of Texas in Austin. He is known for his work on the genus Brickellia.

At the age of 33, Flyr committed suicide in Dallas while undergoing treatment for depression.

The species Brickellia cordifolia is called "Flyr's Nemesis" or "Flyr's brickellbush" in his honor.

References

1937 births
People from Texas
University of Texas at Austin people
20th-century American botanists
1971 deaths
1971 suicides
Suicides in Texas